James "Jim" DeVita is an American actor, director and author. He is a member of the core acting company since 1995 at American Players Theatre, a classical amphitheater located in Spring Green, Wisconsin.

Biography
Devita is from Long Island, New York. He spent years as a first mate on a boat off of Long Island. His one-person show In Acting Shakespeare chronicles his journey from working on fishing boats to becoming an actor and director of classical theater. The play is a personalized adaption of Ian McKellen's Acting Shakespeare, which inspired DeVita to become an actor when he saw it in 1983.
DeVita has spent the bulk of his long acting career at American Players Theatre playing among other Shakespeare roles Hamlet, Romeo, Iago, Macbeth, Leontes, Richard III, Richard II. Other favorites include Jamie Tyrone of Long Days Journey Into Night, Shannon from Night of the Iguana, Gogo in Waiting for Godot and Eddie Carbone in A View from the Bridge.  DeVita married actress, Brenda Bedard in 1990.  They have two children, Gale, born 1996 and Sophia, born 1998.

Reception
In 2015, Wall Street Journal drama critic Terry Teachout wrote that "America has no finer classical actor than Jim DeVita."

Bibliography
Blue (2001)
The Rose of Treason: A Fictional Dramatization Based on the True Story of Sophie Scholl and the White Rose (2003)
The Silenced (2007)
A Winsome Murder (2015)

References

External links

Living people
American male stage actors
Male actors from New York (state)
People from Spring Green, Wisconsin
1960 births